Kněžmost is a municipality and village in Mladá Boleslav District in the Central Bohemian Region of the Czech Republic. It has about 2,200 inhabitants.

Administrative parts
Villages of Býčina, Chlumín, Čížovka, Drhleny, Koprník, Lítkovice, Malobratřice, Násedlnice, Solec, Soleček, Srbsko, Suhrovice, Úhelnice and Žantov are administrative parts of Kněžmost.

Etymology
The name is derived from knížecí most, i.e. "princely bridge". The settlement was founded by an old princely bridge.

Geography
It lies in the Jičín Uplands. The Kněžmostka Stream flows through the municipality and supplies several ponds. The northern part of the territory lies in the Bohemian Paradise Protected Landscape Area.

History
The first written mention of Kněžmost is from 1380, but the customs office was already here in 1316.

Sights
The main landmark of Kněžmost is the Church of Saint Francis of Assissi. It was built in the Empire style in 1838–1843.

Notable people
Jiří Lehečka (born 2001), tennis player

References

External links

Villages in Mladá Boleslav District